Tarita Botsman is an Australian operatic soprano, actor, writer and director.

Education 
Botsman is a graduate of Brisbane Girls Grammar. She completed her undergraduate and postgraduate degrees at the Queensland Conservatorium of Music, whilst also studying acting at QUT, graduated from the Opera Course at Guildhall School of Music and Drama and studied with international singing teacher Margaret Baker Genovesi in Rome, Italy.

She is currently completing her PhD at University of Queensland.

Career 
She made her operatic debut at 22 years of age with Opera Queensland. She studied in Italy, UK and Germany, where she performed over twenty operatic roles. She has performed as an actor, written several shows and has directed various theatrical productions, concerts and ceremonies.

Internationally she has sung as a soloist for Prince Philip, Duke of Edinburgh, at the Worshipful Company of Goldsmiths in London, the London Symphony Orchestra at the Barbican Centre, for the Mother of the UAE, Fatima bint Mubarak Al Ketbi, and toured throughout the UK, Morocco, Italy, France, Japan, Pacific Islands, New Zealand and Australia.

She performed in the role of Sophie for the Australian premiere of Terrence McNally's play Master Class with Queensland Theatre Company, Sydney Theatre Company, State Theatre Company of South Australia and Melbourne Theatre Company alongside Robyn Nevin and Amanda Muggleton, directed by Rodney Fisher.

In 2000 Botsman directed, produced and tour-managed the one man play The Christian Brothers by Australian writer Ron Blair, starring Laurence Coy, throughout the Republic of Ireland which saw it invited to be performed at Dublin Theatre Festival, the Galway International Arts Festival, Kilkenny Arts Festival and the Edinburgh Festival Fringe.

In 2009 she created The 7 Sopranos, who have been consistently in high demand worldwide. They have been working alongside internationally recognised independent producing house Cre8ion since 2014.

Botsman has written several new music theatre works, including Songs from Stage and Screen, Reverie, Brave and Aria Botanica. In 2018 she was assistant director to Daniel Slater for the production of Peter Grimes produced by Opera Queensland and Brisbane Festival.

2018 and 2019 she was the ceremony director for the Australian Women in Music Awards.

Currently she is developing a new theatre work with producers in Australia and the US, based on an original creative treatment she has developed for stage and TV.

Recognition and awards 
Botsman has been the recipient of numerous awards, including the Monash University Italian Studies Award, the Ian Potter Cultural Trust Travel Award, a recipient of funding from the Tait Memorial Trust in the UK, and an Arts Queensland Artist Individual Development Grant.

Botsman is the recipient of Young Australian of the Year (Arts Category) in 1996, Young Queenslander of the Year in the same year, and a Queen’s Trust Award for Excellence in the Arts.

Discography 
2013: The 7 Sopranos; ABC Classics
2014: Treasures; Cre8ion
2016: Popcorn – Songs from Stage and Screen; Cre8ion

References

External links
 

Living people
Year of birth missing (living people)
Queensland Conservatorium Griffith University alumni
Queensland University of Technology alumni
Alumni of the Guildhall School of Music and Drama
Australian operatic sopranos